Atomic Data and Nuclear Data Tables is a quarterly peer-reviewed scientific journal covering nuclear physics. It is published by Elsevier and was established in 1969. The journal was established with the aid of Katharine Way, who later served as its editor until 1973. As of 2016, Boris Pritychenko is the journal's editor-in-chief.

Abstracting and indexing
The journal is abstracted and indexed in:
Chemical Abstracts Service
Current Contents/Physics, Chemical, & Earth Sciences
Energy Research Abstracts
Science Citation Index
Scopus
According to the Journal Citation Reports, the journal has a 2020 impact factor of 2.623.

References

Bibliography

External links

Elsevier academic journals
Nuclear physics journals
English-language journals
Quarterly journals
Publications established in 1969